Dumitru Negoiţă (born 9 February 1960) is a retired male javelin thrower from Romania. He set his personal best (81.88 metres) on 22 July 1990 in Bucharest. Negoiţă is best known for winning the gold medal in the men's javelin throw event at the 1985 Summer Universiade in Kobe, Japan.

References

1960 births
Living people
Romanian male javelin throwers
Universiade medalists in athletics (track and field)
Universiade gold medalists for Romania